Godzilla: The Album is the soundtrack to the 1998 film Godzilla. It was released on May 19, 1998, through Epic Records and mainly consists of alternative rock songs. The soundtrack was a success, peaking at No. 2 on the Billboard 200 and reaching platinum certification. The album was commercially successful in both the United States and Japan, being certified platinum by the RIAJ and RIAA in June and July 1998, respectively.

By July 1998, the album sold 2.5million copies worldwide. It was #56 on the Billboard chart of 1998's best-selling albums, having sold 1.3million copies in the United States by the end of 1998.

Singles
The album's most successful single was Puff Daddy and Jimmy Page's "Come with Me" which peaked at No. 4 on the Billboard Hot 100 and was certified platinum. The single sold a certified 2.025million copies worldwide.

Other hit singles included Jamiroquai's "Deeper Underground", the band's only No. 1 on the UK Singles Chart, and The Wallflowers' cover of "Heroes", which  peaked at number 10 on the Billboard Modern Rock Tracks chart in 1998.

A notable entry is "No Shelter" by Rage Against the Machine, in which a line in the lyrics of the song appears to criticize the film for distracting the public, saying, "Godzilla, pure motherfucking filler. Get your eyes off the real killer."

Track listing

Certifications and sales

References

External links
 

1998 soundtrack albums
Albums produced by Sean Combs
Epic Records soundtracks
Alternative rock soundtracks
Rap rock soundtracks
Albums produced by Brendan O'Brien (record producer)
Godzilla (franchise)